Stéphane Molliens (born 23 September 1974) is a French para table tennis player who has won multiple European para table tennis championship team medals with Vincent Boury, Jean-François Ducay and Fabien Lamirault.

References

External links 
 
 

1974 births
Living people
Sportspeople from Montpellier
French male table tennis players
Paralympic table tennis players of France
Medalists at the 2008 Summer Paralympics
Medalists at the 2012 Summer Paralympics
Medalists at the 2016 Summer Paralympics
Table tennis players at the 2004 Summer Paralympics
Table tennis players at the 2008 Summer Paralympics
Table tennis players at the 2012 Summer Paralympics
Table tennis players at the 2016 Summer Paralympics
Paralympic medalists in table tennis
Paralympic gold medalists for France
Paralympic silver medalists for France
Table tennis players at the 2020 Summer Paralympics
20th-century French people
21st-century French people